Vallabh Sambamurthy is the Albert O. Nicholas Dean of the Wisconsin School of Business of the University of Wisconsin–Madison.

Education 
Vallabh Sambamurthy received his Bachelor of Engineering (B.E.) with honors in mechanical engineering from National Institute of Technology, Tiruchirappalli (formerly Regional Engineering College, Tiruchirappalli) in 1981. He received his Post Graduate Diploma in Management (PGDM) from Indian Institute of Management, Calcutta in 1983 and Doctorate of Philosophy degree from Carlson School of Management, University of Minnesota.

Career 
He has previously served at the business schools of University of Maryland, College Park and Florida State University. He served as the Editor-in-Chief of Information Systems Research, one of the most prestigious Information Systems journals, from 2005 to 2010. He also served as the Eli Broad Professor and Chair of the Department of Accounting and Information Systems at the Eli Broad College of Business at Michigan State University until January 2019.

Awards 
 Distinguished Alumnus Award by the National Institute of Technology Tiruchirappalli, India in 2009.
 The AIS Fellow Award by the Association for Information Systems in 2009
 John D. and Dortha J. Withrow Endowed Teacher Scholar Award by the Broad College and the Excellence in Research awards by the Accounting and Information Systems Department. 
 William Beal Distinguished Faculty Award, the highest honor accorded by Michigan State University in 2014.
 The Sandra Slaughter Service Award by the Association for Information Systems in 2016
 The Leo Award by the Association for Information Systems in 2017

References 

Michigan State University faculty
Year of birth missing (living people)
Living people
National Institute of Technology, Tiruchirappalli alumni
Indian Institute of Management Calcutta alumni
Carlson School of Management alumni
Information systems researchers